Siberian State University of Physical Culture and Sport (Russian: Сибирский государственный университет физической культуры и спорта), shortly named as SibGUFK, is a university located in Omsk, Russia.

History 
The university was found in 1950 and originally named as Omsk State Institute of Physical Culture. The first building given to the Institute was not applicable for sport needs at all because there were no gymnasium and lecture hall. It was students and teachers who reconstruct the building. The first institute director became Victor Golovlev, one from the strongest Siberian field-and-track men of postwar time [1].

In 1994 the institute was renamed into Siberian State Academy of Physical Culture and Sport. In 2003 it has got the status of university. During the all years of work the university has trained about 40 000 specialists, among which there are more than 50 winners and medalists of The Olympic Games. The most famous are such sportsmen, as Sergey Shelpakov (the Moscow Olympic Games 100 kilometers team race winner), Yuri Muchin (the Barcelona Olympic Games 4 × 200 meter freestyle relay winner), Alexey Tishchenko  (the Athens Olympic Games featherweight boxing winner and the Beijing Olympic Games lightweight boxing winner), Alexander Bessmertnykh (the Sochi Olympic Games men's team relay silver medalist) and others [2].

Faculties 
The university provides Bachelor programs, Master's programs and postgraduate (PhD) programs. There are 4 faculties in the university:

 Faculty of Physical Culture 
 Faculty of Sports
 Faculty of Science and Education
 Faculty of Correspondent and Distance Learning

Campus 
The University Campus includes three dormitories, two of them were renovated recently. There are sports and fitness complex «Albatross», sporting arena «Red Star Stadium», field-and-track complex and two football pitches. The university located near one from the biggest and most beautiful Omsk culture and leisure parks – The Culture and Leisure Park is named after 30 years of VLKSM (Russian abbreviation of All-Union Leninist Young Communist League – Всесоюзный ленинский коммунистический союз молодёжи) [3].

References 

 https://sibsport.ru/universitet/istoriya-universiteta
 https://superomsk.ru/news/7200-istoriya_nashix_pobed_omichi_chempion_olimpiyskix_/
 http://park-omsk.ru/

Omsk
Universities in Omsk Oblast
Universities and institutes established in the Soviet Union